Pempelia johannella is a species of snout moth. It is found in Romania and Greece.

References

Moths described in 1916
Phycitini
Moths of Europe
Moths of Asia